Lancaster Township is the name of three townships in the U.S. state of Indiana:

 Lancaster Township, Huntington County, Indiana
 Lancaster Township, Jefferson County, Indiana
 Lancaster Township, Wells County, Indiana

See also
Lancaster Township (disambiguation)

Indiana township disambiguation pages